Thread is the second studio album by American rock band Red Sun Rising. It was released on March 30, 2018 by Razor & Tie. The album reached number 21 on the US Billboard Top Hard Rock Albums chart and spawned six singles (four official and two promotional): "Deathwish", "Veins", "Lonely Girl", "Stealing Life", "Fascination" and "Left for Dead".

Promotion
On March 6, 2018, the band was announced alongside The Fever 333 as opening acts to The Used's spring tour supporting their seventh album The Canyon, beginning with Jacksonville, Florida's Welcome to Rockville festival and finishing at Pryor, Oklahoma's Rocklahoma festival.

The song 'Deathwish' was included in the game Forza Horizon 4s base game soundtrack on the fictional radio station Horizon XS.

Critical reception

Jay H. Goriana from Blabbermouth.net gave the band credit for expanding their sound by creating "soothing, feel good alt rock songs" with a more polished production while also displaying their darker side on tracks like "Evil Like You" and "Lonely Girl", concluding that "Invariably, the group naturally shifts into a gear that's undeniably catchy and uplifting. Through and through, Red Sun Rising is continuing to prove its one of rock's new stars." Chad Childers of Loudwire also praised the production work by Matt Hyde and Jay Ruston for providing "a more fleshed-out presentation" of the band that traverses from "melodic gems ("Left for Dead", "Veins")" to tracks that contain a sinister edge ("Fascination", "Deathwish"), saying that Red Sun Rising have "seized the day on Thread, which continues to show promise for a band bringing a little something different to the rock radio world."

Track listing

Personnel
Adapted credits from the liner notes of Thread.

Red Sun Rising
 Mike Protich - lead vocals, guitar
 Ryan Williams - lead guitar
 Ricky Miller - bass, backing vocals, keys
 Dave McGarry - rhythm guitar, backing vocals
 Pat Gerasia - drums

Production
 Matt Hyde - producer, engineer
 Jay Ruston - mixer
 Paul Logus - mastering
 Gabriel Esparza - assistant engineer

Artwork
 Mike Cortada - album artwork illustrations
 Shervin Lainez - photography

Charts

References

2018 albums
Red Sun Rising albums
Razor & Tie albums
Albums produced by Matt Hyde
Albums recorded at Sonic Ranch